Girabolhos is a civil parish in the municipality of Seia, Portugal. The population in 2011 was 317, in an area of 17.88 km².

History 
In 1882, Girabolhos became a part of the civil parish of Tourais and remained so until it was constituted as its own parish. It is home to several landmarks with local historical significance, namely, the Chapel of Nossa Senhora da Cabeça, the Mother Church, the Chapel of Saint Nicholas, Casa de Girabolhos and the building which serves as the seat of the junta, or parish government. For much of its history, Girabolhos belonged to the Roman Catholic Diocese of Coimbra, though it is today a part of the Diocese of Guarda, itself within the jurisdiction of the Patriarchate of Lisbon.

Religion 
The population of Girabolhos is predominately Roman Catholic. Among the primary annual religious feasts are those of Nossa Senhora da Cabeça (celebrated the Sunday after Ascension Thursday), Saint Anthony (celebrated the weekend nearest 13 June), and Saint Simon (celebrated the last Sunday in October).

Population

Places 
The civil parish of Girabolhos is made up of two main population centers: Girabolhos and Ortigueira.

Mining 
The Fontinha mine in Girabolhos was explored between 1989 and 1991. In 2015, it underwent environmental remediation.

Climate

References

Freguesias of Seia